Dötk is a village in Zala County, Hungary.

References

Populated places in Zala County